Pocket Change  may refer to:
Pocket Change (band), a Christian punk band from the United States
Pocket Change (arcade), a chain of video arcades owned by Namco Cybertainment
Pocket Change (The Price Is Right), a segment game from the television game show The Price Is Right
"Pocket Change", a song by Alabama Shakes from their 2012 album Boys & Girls

See also
Pocket Money